Feel Good may refer to:

Albums
 Feel Good (Ike & Tina Turner album), 1972
 Feel Good (Abigail album), 1994
 Feel Good (Che'Nelle album), 2010
 Feel Good (The Internet album), 2013
 Feels Good (album), 2006 album by Take 6

Songs
 "Feel Good" (Phats & Small song), 1999
 "Feel Good" (G-Unit song), 2008
 "Feel Good" (Modestep song), 2011
 "Feel Good" (Robin Thicke song), 2013
 "Feel Good" (Gryffin and Illenium song), 2017
 "Feel Good", a 2000 song by Madasun
 "Feel Good", a 2009 song by Nolwenn Leroy on her album Le Cheshire Cat et moi
 "Feel Good", a 2017 song by Felix Jaehn and Mike Williams
 "Feel Good", a 2022 song by Bo Burnham from The Inside Outtakes
 "Feel Good (It's Alright)", 2015 song by Blonde
 "Feel Good Inc.", a 2005 song by Gorillaz
 "Feelgood" (song), 2008 song by Ola Svensson
 "Feels Good", 1990 single by Tony! Toni! Toné!
 "Feels Good (Don't Worry Bout a Thing)", 2002 single by Naughty by Nature
 "Feels Good" (Rahsaan Patterson song), 2008

Television
 Feel Good (TV series), a British television series

See also
 Mr Feelgood, a racehorse
 Dr. Feelgood (disambiguation)
 I Feel Good (disambiguation)
 Feeling Good (disambiguation)
 Feels So Good (disambiguation)